1912–1913 War Museum (Emin Agha Inn) is a museum in Ioannina, Greece. The establishment was used as headquarters during the Balkan Wars. In 1950 the establishments were renovated and the museum was founded. The exhibition includes many paintings, armors, swords, guns and many other objects.

External links

Official website, only in Greek
Mention in history wiki.phantis.com
Mention in history www.dailyestimate.com
Museum's photos in Wikimedia Commons

Military and war museums in Greece
Museums in Ioannina
Museums established in 1950
1950 establishments in Greece
Balkan Wars